Aeroflot Flight 2808 ( Reys 2808 Aeroflota) was a scheduled domestic passenger flight from Mineralnye Vody to Ivanovo, both in Russia, with a stopover in Donetsk, Ukraine on 27 August 1992. While attempting to land at Ivanovo airport, the Tupolev Tu-134 crashed into a group of buildings in the village of Lebyazhy Lug. Investigators determined the cause of the accident was errors made by the crew and the air traffic controller. There were no fatalities on the ground, but all 84 people on board the flight died in the crash.

Aircraft 
The aircraft involved in the accident was a Tupolev Tu-134A registered RA-65058 to Aeroflot.  At the time of the accident, the aircraft had sustained 26,307 flight hours and 16,388 pressurization cycles.

Crew 
The cockpit crew consisted of the following:
 Captain Vladimir Nikolayevich Gruzdev (Владимир Николаевич Груздев)
 Co-pilot Vasiliy Yuryevich Gruzdev (Василий Юрьевич Груздев)
 Flight engineer Mikhail Gennadievich Karlov (Михаил Геннадьевич Карлов)
 Flight engineer instructor Yuri Mikhailovich Eremenko (Юрий Михайлович Ерёменко)
 Navigator Mikhail Anatolevich Konovalov (Михаил Анатольевич Коновалов)
The two flight attendants in the cabin were Svetlana Ermilova (Светлана Ермилова) and Tatiana Mokrova (Татьяна Мокрова).

Synopsis 
The second phase of the flight took off from Donetsk at 21:03 Moscow Time. On board the aircraft were the seven crew members and 77 passengers, of whom 21 were children. No issues in flight from Donetsk were reported. At 22:27 and at an altitude of  the flight began to descend  on a bearing of 60° in preparation for the approach, which was to be carried out by the pilot in command.

When communications with the new controller began the flight reported their altitude to be  and proceeded with level flight for 25 seconds.

The flight, having deviated 9 kilometers from the route, had reached the transition level at 22:40. The flight was then  from the aerodrome and flying at a speed of  when it had still not deployed the landing gear;  in the preparations for landing the navigator forgot to set his altimeter to the correct pressure. During the beginning of fourth turn the landing gear was released and the flaps adjusted only when the aircraft

At 22:41 the air traffic controller informed the flight crew of weather conditions with visibility being 1,200 meters and mild fog. Nevertheless, the crew continued with the landing and the air traffic controller did not give the crew any warnings. While descending to the glidepath at an altitude of  the copilot corrected the left bank by adjusting the horizontal stabilizer in one procedure (changing the stabilizer required fulfilling three procedures); doing so caused the aircraft to become less stable.

To enter the glidepath, the captain began to turn to the right causing the aircraft to roll up to 35°. At an altitude of approximately  the captain attempted to take the aircraft out of the bank but did not attempt to slow down the vertical speed. After the navigator's last attempt to convince the captain to abort the landing and make a go-around, the aircraft banked sharply to the right 10°.

The aircraft crashed into the ground  after first striking the trees; several brick buildings and cars were damaged by debris but no one on the ground was killed. All 84 passengers and crew were killed in the crash.

Conclusions 
Investigation showed that there were no mechanical issues with the aircraft itself and the aircraft was intact until it had crashed.

The primary cause of the accident was the captain's decision to continue the route under unsuitable parameters for landing.  Insufficient crew communication and poor cockpit resource management also led to periodic loss of control compounded by failure to follow guidelines for maximum rate of descent as outlined in the Tu-134's flight manual.

The air traffic controller at Ivanovo airport acted in violation of aviation guidelines by not notifying the crew about their deviations from the course and glide path.

See also 

 Eastern Air Lines Flight 401 another case of flight deviating from intended route and crashing due to poor cockpit resource management.
 SAS Flight 933  also crashed on approach due to pilot error
 Iberia Airlines Flight 62  similar instance of crash into terrain

Footnotes

References  

Aviation accidents and incidents in 1992
Aviation accidents and incidents in Russia
2808
1992 disasters in Russia
Accidents and incidents involving the Tupolev Tu-134
Aviation accidents and incidents caused by air traffic controller error
August 1992 events in Russia
Airliner accidents and incidents caused by pilot error
Transport in Ivanovo Oblast